Mylothris schumanni, Schumann's dotted border, is a butterfly in the family Pieridae. It is found in Guinea, Liberia, Ivory Coast, Ghana, Togo, Nigeria, Cameroon, the Republic of the Congo, the Democratic Republic of the Congo, southern Sudan, Burundi, Uganda, Kenya, Tanzania and Zambia. The habitat consists of lowland forests.

Adult males have been recorded mud-puddling on river banks in dense forest. Adults have a weak flight and are found in lighter parts of the forest, but occasionally venture out to feed on flower nectar.

The larvae feed on Santalales species.

Subspecies
Mylothris schumanni schumanni (Guinea, Liberia, Ivory Coast, Ghana, Togo, Nigeria, Cameroon, Republic of the Congo)
Mylothris schumanni uniformis Talbot, 1944 (Democratic Republic of the Congo, southern Sudan, Uganda, Burundi, western Kenya, western Tanzania)
Mylothris schumanni zairiensis Berger, 1981 (northern and central Democratic Republic of the Congo, Zambia)

References

Butterflies described in 1904
Pierini